The Whitecliffs Branch was an  long branch line railway that formed part of New Zealand's national rail network in the Canterbury region of the South Island. It was more industrial than the many rural branches on the South Island's east coast whose traffic primarily derived from agriculture, and it operated from 1875 until 1962.

Construction 
What would have been the first portion of a branch line to Whitecliffs has now become part of the Midland Line. The original plan was for a straight line running directly from Rolleston to Sheffield and Springfield, with a branch built from Kirwee to Darfield. When the railway reached Kirwee, the line to Darfield was built first, and it was from here that construction of two lines began. One line was built towards Sheffield and Springfield, and one towards Whitecliffs. At that stage, it was not known which, if either, would be incorporated in the line to the West Coast.

Surveys for the line from Darfield to Whitecliffs were undertaken in 1872, and with contracts let the next year, work was well underway by 1874. The line was opened all the way to Whitecliffs on 3 November 1875. Stations were established in (from junction to terminus): Hawkins, Homebush, Coalgate, Glentunnel, South Malvern, and Whitecliffs, with goods sheds located at three of these stations. Trains on the line had to deal with steep ascents between Hawkins and Homebush and on the run-up to Whitecliffs.

Three proposals existed in the 19th century regarding the extension of the line. An early proposal suggested that the Whitecliffs Branch should be extended from Whitecliffs to the West Coast via the Wilberforce River and Browning's Pass. Another proposal called for a line departing the branch at Homebush and running via Lake Lyndon up to Cass, from where it would have followed roughly the same route as the present-day line via Arthur's Pass. A third proposal received the support of an 1880 Royal Commission on New Zealand's railways, calling for an extension of the branch into the Rakaia Gorge and to the coalfields near the Acheron River. None of these proposals ever came to fruition. Another significant proposal, the Canterbury Interior Main Line, would have had its junction with the Whitecliffs Branch in Homebush.

Stations 
The following stations were located on the Whitecliffs Branch, in order from the junction at Darfield to the terminus:

 Hawkins
 Homebush
 Coalgate
 Glentunnel
 South Malvern
 Whitecliffs

Operation 
The predominant traffic on the line was lignite coal from the mines, with two private lines running to industries from the branch, one in Homebush for the Homebush Brick and Tile Company, and one in Coalgate for the Homebush Coal Company. It was this traffic that sustained the line's existence, but it did not eventuate in the quantities imagined as the Cantabrian coal fields proved to be small. Substantial quantities of wheat were shipped annually via the line, up to 1,000 tons annually in the 1890s, mainly from Coalgate station. 

In 1928, passenger services were stopped and buses handled by New Zealand Railways Department were used, though passenger services – primarily picnic trains – operated sporadically until 13 March 1949. Freight trains were running thrice weekly in 1951, but losses had been mounting for two decades and the coalfield was close to being exhausted. Further declines in the volume of traffic on the line led to its closure on 31 March 1962.

Today
Some relics from the Whitecliffs Branch still exist, despite the fact that remnants of closed railways tend to disappear over time due to human and natural influences. The formation is visible in places, a bridge still spans over the Waianiwaniwa River between Hawkins and Coalgate, and some bridge abutments and piles remain in situ. Platform edges survive in Homebush, Glentunnel and Coalgate, and in Whitecliffs, the engine shed is preserved and still possesses its water tank that served steam locomotives, and a loading bank can be found nearby.

An historical site in Westview Park, Darfield was officially opened on 6 February 2015, 52 years after its closure. Homebush's original station building was restored to its original state and donated by the Slattery Family Estate, and is used as the memorial site.

References

Citations

Bibliography 

  
 
 
 Hermann, Bruce J; South Island Branch Lines pp 11 (1997, New Zealand Railway & Locomotive Society, Wellington)

External links 
 Aerial view of the branch.

Railway lines in New Zealand
Rail transport in Canterbury, New Zealand
3 ft 6 in gauge railways in New Zealand
Railway lines opened in 1875
Railway lines closed in 1962
Closed railway lines in New Zealand